Holvey is a surname. Notable people with the surname include:

 Annabel Morris Holvey (1855–1910), American newspaper editor, social reformer
 Bill Holvey, the Alliance candidate for Otago in the 1999 New Zealand general election.
 Paul R. Holvey, a Democratic Party candidate in the 2006 Oregon primary election.
 Samantha Holvey, a beauty queen who has competed in the Miss USA pageant.
 Thomas Holvey, a Liberal Democrat politician in the United Kingdom who stood in Selby and Ainsty in the 2010 general election.

Other
 A fictional Holvey family which appeared in "The Calusari", the twenty-first episode of the second season of The X-Files.